Anselmus Ephorinus (Anzelm Eforyn, Eforinus) (c. 1505 – December 1566) was a Silesian humanist and doctor.

Life
Born in Mirsk . Ephorinus enrolled at the Cracow Academy in 1515, earning a baccalarius in 1522 and a magister in 1527. He briefly lectured there on dialectics and logic. He also worked as a tutor and counted a young Jan Boner and the son of Justus Ludovicus Decius among his pupils. With the former, Ephorinus travelled widely, stopping in Erfurt and Nürnberg, reaching Freiburg in 1531. There, Ephorinus stayed with Erasmus for some months. He studied medicine in Padua, earning a medical doctorate on 11 April 1534.

Ephorinus returned to Cracow in autumn 1537. On his return to Cracow, he was appointed as the first town doctor, and not long thereafter the king appointed him physician to the Wieliczka salt mine. In Cracow, Ephorinus was part of the Erasmian circle of Leonard Cox. Franciszek Mymer wrote a poem, titled "In salvum reditum Anselmi Ephoryni..." (1538) celebrating Ephorinus’ return to Poland.

He corresponded with Erasmus. Ephorinus is now considered an early advocate of a distinct Silesian identity. In their correspondence Erasmus frequently referred to Ephorinus as a Pole. To put this to rest, Ephorinus signed a letter: Tuus et suus, Anselmus Ephorinus, Silesius non Polonus (Your and my own, Anselmus Ephorinus, a Silesian, not a Pole).

Anselmus Ephorinus died in 1566. He is buried in Cracow.

Works
 (as editor) Heyden, Sebastian. Puerilium colloquiorum formulae. Cracow: Hieronymus Vietor, 1527.
 Medicinale compendium. Cracow: Hieronymus Vietor, 1542.

References
Notes

Bibliography
Encyklopedya Powszechna Kieszonkowa. vol. 10. Warsaw: Noskowski, 1888.
 Bietenholz, Peter G., and Thomas Brian Deutscher, eds. Contemporaries of Erasmus: A Biographical Register of the Renaissance and Reformation. Toronto; Buffalo: University of Toronto Press, 1985.
 Lachs, J. “Anselmus Ephorinus”. Archiwum Historii i Filozofii Medycyny (Poznań) 4 (1926) 40-54, 194-209.

1566 deaths
Year of birth uncertain
People from Lwówek Śląski County
People from Silesia
1500s births